Why Does the Sun Shine? (The Sun Is a Mass of Incandescent Gas) is an EP by alternative rock band They Might Be Giants, released in 1993. The EP is notable for being their first release with a full-band lineup, rather than only the two original members (John Flansburgh and John Linnell) performing. It was also released as a single on 7-inch vinyl.

Songs
The title song is a cover of a song by Hy Zaret from Tom Glazer's 1959 album Space Songs. The lyrics for the refrain appear verbatim in the 1951 Golden Nature Guide Stars. They Might Be Giants re-arranged the song in an uptempo version for their 1998 live album, Severe Tire Damage, and their 2009 children's album, Here Comes Science, on which they added the self-penned "Why Does the Sun Really Shine? (The Sun is a Miasma of Incandescent Plasma)", which corrects several factual inaccuracies in the original song. It was also included on the soundtrack to the children's game show Carmen Sandiego: Out of This World (1994).

The second track, "Jessica", was originally recorded by the Allman Brothers Band for their 1973 album Brothers and Sisters. The third track, "Whirlpool", is a song written by alternative rock band Meat Puppets, and can be found on their 1991 album Forbidden Places. The fourth and final track, "Spy", is the lone original composition on the EP. It was later re-recorded for the band's successive studio album, John Henry, released in 1994.

Music video
A music video for the song directed by Maciek Albrecht was featured in an episode of the Nickelodeon television series KaBlam!. In the video, a group of students are listening to a scientist talk about the sun, which makes its way to them and shines its brightest.

Track listing
CD

The 7-inch vinyl release contains track 1 on side A and track 2 on side B.

Personnel
John Linnell – accordion, saxophone, bass clarinet, vocal
John Flansburgh – electric guitar, vocal

Additional musicians
Brian Doherty – drums, glockenspiel
Kurt Hoffman – clarinet, saxophone
Frank London – trumpet
Graham Maby – bass guitar

Technical
They Might Be Giants – producer
Patrick Dillett – engineer, mixing

References

External links
Why Does The Sun Shine? EP on This Might Be A Wiki
"Why Does The Sun Shine?" (song) on This Might Be A Wiki
 Why Does The Sun Shine? at the National Institute of Environmental Health Sciences

1993 debut EPs
They Might Be Giants EPs
Elektra Records EPs
Songs about science